Eledio is a village in the Paphos District of Cyprus, located 1 km northeast of Axylou.

References

Communities in Paphos District